The EG Awards of 2007 are the second Annual The Age EG (Entertainment Guide) Awards and took place at the Prince of Wales in November 2007.

Hall of Fame inductees
Kim Salmon

The Age music writer Patrick Donovan said Salmon's sound extended beyond Australia, influencing the likes of Nirvana and Mudhoney. Donovan said  "There's an argument … that grunge was actually invented in Australia by garage bands like The Scientists, the Cosmic Psychos and the Lime Spiders, Kim has spent much of his career confounding people as he experimented and evolved. We are the better for it."

Award nominees and winners
Winners indicated below in boldface

References

2007 in Australian music
2007 music awards
Music Victoria Awards